Taylor Sherman  (September 5, 1758 – May 14, 1815) was a member of the Connecticut House of Representatives from Norwalk in the sessions of May 1794, May 1795, and May 1796.

Sherman was born in Woodbury, Connecticut on September 5, 1758. He was the son of Judge Daniel Sherman. and Mindwell Taylor Sherman.

He married Elizabeth Stoddard of Woodbury in 1787. After he was admitted to the bar, he moved to Norwalk, where he practiced law.

He was a judge of Probate for the District of Norwalk from the creation of the district in 1802 until his death.

He was appointed collector of Internal Revenue for the Second District of Connecticut by James Madison.

He was appointed Agent to survey land in the Connecticut Western Reserve consisting of a half million acres which was granted to those who suffered losses from the Battle of Norwalk. He acquired a large tract of this land in Sherman township, Huron County, Ohio, which bears his name.

He was the father of Charles Robert Sherman, justice of the Supreme Court of Ohio, and grandfather of General William Tecumseh Sherman.

The Taylor Sherman House was located at 89 Main Street in Norwalk, and the house's design was studied for the Historic American Buildings Survey by the Library of Congress.

Further reading 
 GENERAL WILLIAM T. SHERMAN "MEMOIRS"
 New York Times – The Sherman Family

References 

1758 births
1815 deaths
Burials in Mill Hill Burying Ground
Connecticut lawyers
Connecticut state court judges
Members of the Connecticut House of Representatives
Politicians from Norwalk, Connecticut
People from Woodbury, Connecticut
Probate court judges in the United States
Tax collectors
19th-century American lawyers